2009–10 Belarusian Cup was the nineteenth season of the Belarusian annual cup competition. Contrary to the league season, it was conducted in a fall-spring rhythm. The first games were played on 12 July 2009. Winners of the Cup qualify for the UEFA Europa League second qualifying round.

First round
Into this round entered 32 teams from the Belarusian First League (second level) and lower. These matches were held on 12 and 15 July 2009.

Round of 32
Into this round entered the 16 winners from the First Round, two First Division clubs and the 14 clubs from the Belarusian Premier League. The winners from the First Round were drawn against those clubs that received a bye to this round. These matches took place on 7, 8 and 9 August 2009.

Round of 16
The matches were played between October and November 2009.

|}

First leg

Second leg

Quarterfinals
The first leg games were held on 13 and 14 March 2010 and the second leg games were held on 17 and 18 March 2010. Most of the games were played in Minsk on artificial grounds due to bad grass pitch conditions in March.

|}

First leg

Second leg

Semifinals
The first legs were held on 24 March 2010 and the second legs were held on 28 March 2010. All games were played in Minsk on artificial grounds due to bad grass pitch conditions in March.

|}

First leg

Second leg

Final

See also
 2009 Belarusian Premier League
 2010 Belarusian Premier League

External links
 Official website 
 soccerway.com

Belarusian Cup
Cup
Cup
Belarusian Cup seasons